Arnold John Malone (born 9 December 1937) was a Progressive Conservative party member of the House of Commons of Canada. He was a public servant by career.

He initially represented the Alberta riding of Battle River where he was first elected in the 1974 federal election.  Battle River was abolished before the 1979 election, and most of its territory was merged into neighboring Crowfoot.  Malone was elected from Crowfoot in 1979, 1980, 1984 and 1988 federal elections. He served in the 30th, 31st, 32nd, 33rd and 34th Canadian Parliaments before leaving federal politics. During his term in office, he served as chair of the National Defence Committee.

Malone currently resides in Invermere, British Columbia and writes a column for the weekly newspaper Columbia Valley Pioneer.

References
 

1937 births
Living people
Members of the House of Commons of Canada from Alberta
Progressive Conservative Party of Canada MPs